Veertien Mie (ヴィアティン三重, Vu~iatin Mie) is a Japanese football club based between Kuwana and Yokkaichi, Mie Prefecture. They currently play in the Japan Football League, the Japanese fourth tier of league football.

History
"Veertien" means "fourteen" in Dutch, after Johan Cruijff's playing number. As with V-Varen Nagasaki, their colours are orange with traces of blue. Founded as Veertien FC in 2012 to bring a team from Mie Prefecture to professional football in Japan, Doru Isac was invited to overview the activities at the club. After using the name Veertien Kuwana for two seasons from 2013, they converted the identity from the 2015 season to Veertien Mie.

Results came rapidly, since the club was able to clinch five promotions in a row, from the 3rd division of the Mie Prefectural League to the Japan Football League for the 2017 season. They also featured in one edition of the Emperor's Cup, reaching the 2nd round in 2014 and losing to Cerezo Osaka only after extra time.

League and cup record

Key

Current squad
As of 9 March 2023.

Coaching staff
As of the 2023 season

Managerial history 
As of the February 2022

Kit evolution

References

External links
Official Website

 
Association football clubs established in 2012
Football clubs in Japan
Japan Football League clubs
Sports teams in Mie Prefecture